Sydney Shaun Lawton (born 1941 in New Marske, North Riding of Yorkshire) is an English playwright, poet, actor and singer/songwriter. Lawton is probably best known for his Desperado Corner, which has been described as a 'sprawling, four-act, mad, wonderful play... about working class boys from Redcar standing in pools of piss swearing'. Lawton showed the play to Di Trevis, who directed its premier in the Glasgow Citizens Theatre in 1981.

Lawton later played film roles in Possession (1981), John Rabe (2009), and Anonymous (2011).

References

External links

Official website

English male stage actors
English dramatists and playwrights
English expatriates in Germany
Living people
People from Redcar and Cleveland
Male actors from Yorkshire
English male dramatists and playwrights
English male poets
1941 births